Wildes Meadow is a locality in the Southern Highlands of New South Wales, Australia, in Wingecarribee Shire. 

At the 2021 census, there were 249 people living at Wildes Meadow.

References

Towns of the Southern Highlands (New South Wales)
Wingecarribee Shire